Ilmir Hazetdinov (born October 28, 1991 in Ulyanovsk) is a Russian ski jumper. He is of Tatar descent.

Hazetdinov competed at the 2014 Winter Olympics for Russia. He placed 18th in the normal hill qualifying round, and 35th in the first jump of the final round, failing to advance. He placed 32nd in the large hill qualifying round, and 29th in the final. He was also a member of the Russian team that placed 9th in the team event.

Hazetdinov made his World Cup debut in March 2012. As of September 2014, his best finish is 7th, in a team event at Lahti in 2011–12. His best individual finish is 31st, at a large hill event at Engelberg in 2013–14.

References

1991 births
Living people
Volga Tatar people
Tatar people of Russia
Tatar sportspeople
Olympic ski jumpers of Russia
Ski jumpers at the 2014 Winter Olympics
Sportspeople from Ulyanovsk
Russian male ski jumpers
Universiade medalists in ski jumping
Universiade gold medalists for Russia
Universiade silver medalists for Russia
Competitors at the 2013 Winter Universiade
Competitors at the 2015 Winter Universiade